The Virginia Slims of Nashville is a defunct WTA Tour tennis tournament held in Nashville, Tennessee between 1973 and 1984 and at the Maryland Farms Racquet Club in Brentwood, Tennessee between 1988 and 1991. The tournament was played on indoor carpet courts in 1983 and on indoor hardcourts in 1984 and from 1988 to 1991.

Results

Singles

Doubles

References

External links
 WTA Results Archive

 
Indoor tennis tournaments
Hard court tennis tournaments
Carpet court tennis tournaments
1973 establishments in Tennessee
Sports competitions in Nashville, Tennessee
Tennis in Tennessee
Defunct tennis tournaments in the United States
Virginia Slims tennis tournaments